John Jeffrey Krish  (4 December 1923 – 7 May 2016) was a British film director and screenwriter. He directed and filmed much archive footage and in particular Our School in 1962, showing the changing ways of Britain's school and the last few years of the 11-plus exam.

In November 2010, the British Film Institute compiled four of Krish's documentary short filmsThe Elephant Will Never Forget (1953), They Took Us to the Sea (1961), Our School (1962) and I Think They Call Him John (1964)as A Day in the Life: Four Portraits of Post-War Britain. This compilation won the award for Best Documentary for 2010 at the Evening Standard British Film Awards.

Selected filmography
 General Election (1945, short film) - editor
 The Elephant Will Never Forget (1953, short film)
 Companions in Crime (1954)
 Captured (1959)
 Return To Life (1960, short film) - writer, director and narrator
 They Took Us to the Sea (1961) - writer and director
 Our School (1962) - writer and director
 The Wild Affair (1963) - writer and director
 Unearthly Stranger (1963)
 I Think They Call Him John (1964) - writer and director
 Decline and Fall... of a Birdwatcher (1968)
 The Man Who Had Power Over Women (1970)
 Drive Carefully, Darling (1975, short film) - director and co-writer
 The Finishing Line short (1977, short film) - director and co-writer
 Jesus (1979) - co-director
 Friend or Foe (1982)
 Out of the Darkness (1985) - writer, director and editor

References

External links

 Imperial War Museum Interview
 BFI - In memoriam
 Obituary - Telegraph
 

1923 births
2016 deaths
British film directors
British male screenwriters
Writers from London
English male writers